Panayiota Vlahaki (born 3 April 1991) is a Greek long distance runner who specialises in the marathon. She competed in the women's marathon event at the 2016 Summer Olympics. She finished in 118th place with a time of 2:59:12.

References

External links
 

1991 births
Living people
Greek female long-distance runners
Greek female marathon runners
Place of birth missing (living people)
Athletes (track and field) at the 2016 Summer Olympics
Olympic athletes of Greece